Friedemann Schulz von Thun (born August 6, 1944 in Soltau) is a German psychologist and expert in interpersonal communication and intrapersonal communication. Schulz von Thun worked as a professor of psychology at the University of Hamburg until his retirement on 30 Sep. 2009. Among his various publications is a three-part book series titled "Miteinander Reden" (Talking With Each Other) which has become a standard textbook series in Germany and is widely taught in schools, universities, and vocational skills training. Schulz von Thun developed a number of comprehensive theoretical models to help people understand the determinants and processes of inter-personal exchange and their embeddedness in the individual inner states and the outward situation. He invented the four sides model and developed a widely used visualization of the virtue square.

Publications 
1981, Miteinander reden 1 – Störungen und Klärungen. Allgemeine Psychologie der Kommunikation. Rowohlt, Reinbek, 
1989, Miteinander reden 2 – Stile, Werte und Persönlichkeitsentwicklung. Differentielle Psychologie der Kommunikation. Rowohlt, Reinbek, 
1998, Miteinander reden 3 – Das „innere Team“ und situationsgerechte Kommunikation. Rowohlt, Reinbek, 
2004, . Rowohlt, Reinbek, 

As editor
2000/2003, with Johannes Ruppel, Roswitha Stratmann: Miteinander reden: Kommunikation für Führungskräfte. Rowohlt, Reinbek, 
2004, with Wibke Stegemann: Das Innere Team in Aktion. Praktische Arbeit mit dem Modell. Rowohlt, Reinbek 2004,

References

External links
 
extracts from the books of Prof. Schulz von Thun
The official Website of Prof. Schulz von Thun
Schulz von Thun's workgroup at the University of Hamburg

German psychologists
1944 births
Communication theorists
Living people
Academic staff of the University of Hamburg